Pseudomasaris is a genus of pollen wasps of the family Vespidae, found in arid regions of western North America. They feed their larvae on the pollen and nectar of a variety of plants, though many species prefer flowers in the genus Phacelia. They are colored black with yellow or white markings that, in a few species, resemble the coloration of yellowjackets.

Species
Pseudomasaris contains 15 species:
Pseudomasaris basirufus Rohwer, 1912
Pseudomasaris cazieri Bohart, 1963
Pseudomasaris coquilletti Rohwer, 1911
Pseudomasaris edwardsii (Cresson, 1872)
Pseudomasaris macneilli Bohart, 1963
Pseudomasaris macswaini Bohart, 1963
Pseudomasaris maculifrons (Fox, 1894) 
Pseudomasaris marginalis (Cresson, 1864)
Pseudomasaris micheneri Bohart, 1963
Pseudomasaris occidentalis (Cresson, 1871)
Pseudomasaris phaceliae Rohwer, 1912
Pseudomasaris texanus (Cresson, 1871)
Pseudomasaris vespoides (Cresson, 1863)
Pseudomasaris wheeleri Bequard, 1929
Pseudomasaris zonalis (Cresson, 1864)

References

External links
Pseudomasaris, ZipCodeZoo
Pseudomasaris, Global Biodiversity Information Facility

Vespidae
Hymenoptera of North America